Aicha Tachinouite (berber: ⵄⵉⵛⴰ ⵜⴰⵛⵉⵏⵡⵉⵜ; born 1968) is a Moroccan Shilha singer and dancer. She sings and performs mainly in Tashelhit, her native Berber tongue.

Biography 
Aicha Ziati was born in 1968 in Inezgane, Morocco. She started dancing, singing, and composing music for school activities during her childhood. In the early 1990s, she started dancing and singing together with some of the biggest Amazigh was at that time such as Hassan Arsmouk and Outaleb El Mzoudi. Soon after, she became very popular in Morocco and started performing around the world.

Concert tour 
She participated in several national festivals in Morocco such as Mawazine and Timitar. She has also performed in international festivals such as in Japan and China.

See also 
 Tashelhit
 Naima Moujahid
 Fatima Tabaamrant
 Raissa Kelly
 Jennifer Grout

References 

20th-century Moroccan women singers
Berber Moroccans
Berber musicians
Living people
1968 births
Shilha people
Moroccan dancers
21st-century Moroccan women singers